The Stratus 36, also called the 107 Stratus for its metric length in decimetres, is a Swedish sailboat that was designed by Peter Norlin as an International Offshore Rule Three-Quarter Ton class  racer-cruiser and first built in 1980.

The design is a development of Regnbagen, a one-off boat that won the Three-Quarter Ton class Cup in Hundested, Denmark in 1979.

Production
The design was built by Albin Marine in Sweden between 1980 and 1984, with 130 examples completed. After Albin production ended a few boats were built in South Korea between 1984 and 1986, but it is now out of production.

Design
The Stratus 36 is a racing keelboat, built predominantly of fibreglass, with wood trim. The early boats built had teak decks. It has a 7/8 fractional sloop rig with a deck-stepped mast, aluminum spars, wire standing rigging and a single set of unswept spreaders. The hull has a raked stem, a reverse transom, an internally mounted spade-type rudder controlled by a wheel and a fixed fin keel. It displaces  and carries  of lead ballast.

The design has sleeping accommodation for five to seven people, with a double "V"-berth in the bow cabin, two straight settees in the main cabin and an aft cabin with a double berth on the starboard side and a single berth on the port side. The galley is located on the port side just forward of the companionway ladder. The galley is equipped with a three-burner stove, with an oven and a double sink. A navigation station is opposite the galley, on the starboard side. The head is located opposite the galley on the starboard side.

See also
List of sailing boat types

References

Keelboats
1980s sailboat type designs
Sailing yachts
Sailboat type designs by Peter Norlin
Sailboat types built by Albin Marine